Jellum  is a village in Leeuwarden in the province of Friesland, the Netherlands. It had a population of around 142 in January 2017.

History
The village was first mentioned in the 13th century as Helmum, and means "settlement of the people of Helm (person)". The Dutch Reformed church dated from around 1700. In 1893, it was struck by lightning and both the church and tower burnt down. In 1840, Jellum was home to 96 people.

Before 2018, the village was part of the Littenseradiel municipality and before 1984 it belonged to Baarderadeel municipality.

Gallery

References

External links

Leeuwarden
Populated places in Friesland